Nasir Raza Kazmi ( was an Urdu poet from Pakistan. Kazmi was born on 8 December 1925 at Ambala, Punjab, (British India).
 
Kazmi used simple words in his poetry, including "Chand", "Raat", "Baarish", "Mausam", "Yaad", "Tanhai", "Darya" and gave them life by his style of poetry. He was known for using chhotee beher or short verses in his poetry. His poetry continues to be used on Pakistan Television (PTV) TV shows as well as in India in Bollywood films.

Early life and career
Kazmi emigrated from Ambala, India to Lahore, Pakistan(resided in Krishan Nagar / Islampura) in August 1947. In Lahore, he worked as the editor of the literary magazines Auraq Nau and Khayal. He also worked as a staff editor for Radio Pakistan, Lahore. He was frequently thought of as a melancholic poet, though most of his poetry is based on romantic happiness and hope.

Nasir Kazmi was influenced by the romantic poetry of Akhtar Sheerani and also took guidance in his poetry from the poet Hafeez Hoshiarpuri. He also had great admiration for the poetry of Mir Taqi Mir.

Some of his collection of poems were published as books, including Berg-i-Nai (1952), Deewaan (1972), Pehli Baarish (1975), Hijr Ki Raat Ka Sitara and Nishat-i-Khwab (1977). A few days before his death, Kazmi said in a television interview:"Horse riding, hunting, wandering in a village, walking along the river side, visiting mountains etc. were my favourite pastimes and probably this was the time when my mind got nourishment for loving nature and getting close to the expression of poetry. All my hobbies are related with fine arts, like singing, poetry, hunting, chess, love of birds, love of trees. ... I started writing poetry because I used to reflect that all the beautiful things, those I see and those in nature, are not in my hands, and they go away from me. Few moments of time which dies, cannot be made alive. I think can come alive in poetry, that is why I (Nasir) started writing poetry!"

Commemorative postage stamp
In 2013, Pakistan Post released a commemorative postage stamp of Rs 15 denomination in its 'Men of Letters' series to commemorate Kazmi's death.

Family
Kazmi's son, Basir Sultan Kazmi (born 1955, Pakistan), became a poet and dramatist. Writing in both Urdu and English, he earned an MBE for services to poetry. He has resided in England since 1990, where he was awarded the North West Playwrights Workshop Award in 1992 and published an abridged translation of his long play Bisaat (entitled "The Chess Board") along with several volumes of poetry both in Urdu and English. He is currently the Royal Literary Fund Fellow at the University of Chester.

Death

Nasir Kazmi died on 2 March 1972 at Lahore, Pakistan due to stomach cancer.

Bibliography
Some of his books include:

Poetry
 Berg-i-Nai (1952)
 Deewaan (1972)
 Pehli Baarish (1975)
 Hijr Ki Raat Ka Sitara
 Nishat-i-Khwab (1977)
 Woh Tera Shaair, Woh Tera Nasir

Others
San sattāvan merī nazạr men̲. On the Sepoy Rebellion of 1857.
Sur kī chāyā : ek kathā. Versified play.
K̲h̲ushk cashme ke kināre. Critical articles on Urdu literature.
Nasir Kazmi ki dairy : chand pareshan kaghaz. Memoirs.

References

1925 births
1972 deaths
People from Ambala
Poets from Lahore
Punjabi people
Pakistani poets
Urdu-language poets from Pakistan
Government College University, Lahore alumni
20th-century poets
Burials at Mominpura Graveyard